Peter and Paul is a television miniseries that originally aired on CBS in two 2-hour parts on April 12, 1981 and April 14, 1981. This biblical drama featured Anthony Hopkins as Paul of Tarsus and Robert Foxworth as Peter the Fisherman, David Gwillim as Mark and Jon Finch as Luke. It was directed by Robert Day. The historically-based miniseries covers much of the Book of Acts in its Biblical re-telling of chapters 8 through 28, including the apostolic missionary journeys and interactions of Peter and Paul.

Synopsis 
Living in Jerusalem just after Christ’s death and resurrection, Paul does his best to destroy the early Christian church. He participates in the execution of the first Christian martyr, Stephen (Acts 7:55–8:4) just before Paul's supernatural encounter with Jesus on the road to Damascus (Acts 9). From there, in episodic detail the miniseries highlights the Christian Jews' early reluctance to welcome Paul (Acts 11), and King Herod Agrippa having James and the Son of Zebedee executed by sword.

Next is Peter's own arrest, his miraculous release from prison, and appearance at the house of Mary the mother of John, also called Mark (Acts 12). This is followed by Paul's eventual partnership with Barnabas in ministry to the Gentiles beginning with their 1st Missionary Journey (Acts 13–14). Then comes the Jerusalem Council meeting, called to debate whether or not male Gentiles who were converting as followers of Jesus were required to become circumcised (Acts 15).

Following this, the series follows their 2nd Missionary Journey (Acts 15:36-18:22) including receiving the eager converts in Galatia and Greece, as well as their arrest and equally miraculous release from a Philippian prison (Acts 16:16-40). This is followed by Paul's Sermon on Mars Hill (Acts 17:22-34), their 3rd Missionary Journey (Acts 18:23–20:38) and afterwards Paul being recognized and seized in the Jerusalem Temple (Acts 21). The series concludes with Paul's journey to Rome for his trial.

The purpose of all of Paul’s missionary journeys was the same: proclaiming God’s grace in forgiving sin through Christ. Trials always follow Paul. The miniseries dramatizes Paul's trials before the Sanhedrin (Acts 22 and 23), his trial before the Roman Governor Felix (Acts 24), and then Paul's trials before his successor, the Roman Governor Festus and the Jewish King Agrippa (Acts 25 and 26).

Paul's ocean voyage to Rome (Acts 27) includes the storm and shipwreck, and his coming ashore in Malta and arrival in Rome. He preaches in Rome under government house arrest for two years before being executed by Nero, after which Peter arrives in Rome and is crucified.

Production 
 
The miniseries was shot in Rhodes, Greece. It won one Emmy (for makeup) and was nominated for a second (for costumes).

Cast 
 Anthony Hopkins as Saul/Paul of Tarsus
 Robert Foxworth as Apostle Peter
 Denis Lill as James the Just
 Herbert Lom as Barnabas
 Jon Finch as Luke the Evangelist
 John Rhys-Davies as Silas
 David Gwillim as Mark the Evangelist
 Clive Arrindell as Timothy
 Jose Ferrer as Gamaliel
 Emrys James as Ananias of Damascus
 Jean Peters as Priscilla
 Giannis Voglis as John the Apostle
 Nicholas Savalis as James, son of Zebedee
 Julian Fellowes as Caesar Nero
 Eddie Albert as Porcius Festus
 Raymond Burr as Herod Agrippa I
 Paul Herzberg as Herod Agrippa II
 Olga Karlatos as Berenice (daughter of Herod Agrippa I)
 Valentine Dyall as Seneca the Younger
 Donald Douglas as Sextus Afranius Burrus
 Gareth Thomas as Julius

References

External links 
 

1981 films
Films about Christianity
Films about religion
Films directed by Robert Day
Martyrdom in fiction